The John D. Hart House is a historic home built  and located at 54 East Curlis Avenue in Hopewell Township near the borough of Pennington in Mercer County, New Jersey. It was documented by the Historic American Buildings Survey in 1937. The house was added to the National Register of Historic Places on October 18, 1972, for its significance in architecture.

History and description
Built , the house is an example of a clapboard house in the county.  Its builder is presumed to be a relation, perhaps a nephew, of John Hart, who was a signer of the Declaration of Independence and lived in nearby Hopewell.  The house is notable for its similarity to the John White House in Lawrenceville.

See also
National Register of Historic Places listings in Mercer County, New Jersey

References

External links
 
 

Pennington, New Jersey
Hopewell Township, Mercer County, New Jersey
National Register of Historic Places in Mercer County, New Jersey
Houses on the National Register of Historic Places in New Jersey
Houses in Mercer County, New Jersey
Historic American Buildings Survey in New Jersey
New Jersey Register of Historic Places